Dubach is a town in Lincoln Parish, Louisiana, United States. The population was 961 at the 2010 census, an increase from 800 in 2000. Dubach High School, located centrally in the town, is noted for fielding good athletic teams in basketball and often defeats teams from much larger towns and cities. Dubach is also known as the "Dogtrot Capital of the World" because of the presence of numerous nearby dogtrot houses.

Dubach is part of the Ruston Micropolitan Statistical Area.

History
Although there were settlers in the Dubach area as early as the late-1840s, the town's origins date to the arrival of the Arkansas Southern Railway in 1898. With the coming of the railroad, the way was opened for the development of the lumber industry. In 1899, Fred B. Dubach, a lumberman from St. Louis, Missouri, arrived in the area and started the Dubach Lumber Company. Shortly thereafter he built a large house and a lumber mill was located across the road. An old aerial photograph indicates that the lumber mill was by far the largest building in town and visually dominated the townscape. Undoubtedly the Dubach Lumber Company was a major factor in the growth and development of what in 1901 was chartered as the town of Dubach. A few years later (c. 1906), Dubach sold his mill and home and returned to St, Louis.  Dubach's home still stands and is listed on the National Register of Historic Places. The sawmill no longer exists.

In the fall of 2005, Dubach voters defeated a bond issue that would have funded renovations to Hico Elementary and Dubach High schools. Despite a well-spoken campaign by high school principal Donna Doss, voters killed the issue by a wide margin. Local media speculated that the economic effects of Hurricane Katrina may have swayed voters to err on the side of caution with regards to new taxation. The high school closed and students now attend Ruston High School. Only Dubach Elementary School remains.

Geography

Demographics

2020 census

As of the 2020 United States census, there were 908 people, 387 households, and 241 families residing in the town.

2000 census
As of the census of 2000, there were 800 people, 341 households, and 240 families residing in the town. The racial makeup of the town was 64.62% White, 34.88% African American, 0.38% from other races, and 0.12% from two or more races. Hispanic or Latino of any race were 1.00% of the population.

There were 341 households, out of which 29.3% had children under the age of 18 living with them, 45.7% were married couples living together, 22.3% had a female householder with no husband present, and 29.6% were non-families. 27.3% of all households were made up of individuals, and 16.1% had someone living alone who was 65 years of age or older. The average household size was 2.35 and the average family size was 2.83.

In the town, the population was spread out, with 24.9% under the age of 18, 10.1% from 18 to 24, 25.5% from 25 to 44, 20.4% from 45 to 64, and 19.1% who were 65 years of age or older. The median age was 36 years. For every 100 females, there were 75.1 males. For every 100 females age 18 and over, there were 72.2 males.

The median income for a household in the town was $24,531, and the median income for a family was $30,000. Males had a median income of $32,353 versus $16,538 for females. The per capita income for the town was $15,306. About 17.3% of families and 20.2% of the population were below the poverty line, including 30.5% of those under age 18 and 16.5% of those age 65 or over.

Arts and culture

The Autrey house (and museum) just west of town is the oldest home in the area and is an excellent example of the early and rare form of frontier architecture.

Festivals
Dubach is also home to the Louisiana Chicken Festival, held in late September.

Notable people
 Bill Doss, an American rock musician and native of Dubach.
Dixie Garr, Technology Executive
 Willis Reed, former New York Knicks center and member of the Naismith Memorial Basketball Hall of Fame

References

External links
Town of Dubach

Towns in Lincoln Parish, Louisiana
Towns in Louisiana
Towns in Ruston, Louisiana micropolitan area